Italy at the European Race Walking Team Championships, at senior level, participated at all editions of the European Race Walking Team Championships (European Race Walking Cup until 2021) from La Coruña 1996.

Medals
The statistics refers at 2021, included only the men's and women's senior races.

Medals details

Individual

Team
Medals are awarded to all participating athletes.

Multiple medalists

Men

Women

See also 
 Italy national athletics team
 Italy at the World Athletics Race Walking Team Championships
 Italian team at the running events

References

External links
European Race Walking Team Championships Poděbrady 2021 Statistics handbook
 European Race Walking Cup - Historyat EAA 
 Medailists by countries
 European RACE WALKING CUP at gbratghletics.com(from 1961 to 2006)

European Race Waliking Cup